Kara Edwards (born February 17, 1977) is an American voice actress working for the English versions of Japanese anime. She is also well known in the Charlotte, North Carolina area for her past career as a radio host.

Career 
Edwards began her broadcast career with a job at Radio Disney out of Dallas, Texas the fall after she graduated from high school. She interned for eight months before landing the more permanent jobs of writer, producer, voice actress and children's voice director.

In July 1997, she became co-host of the Squeege and Kara Show on syndicated Radio Disney with friend and fellow voice actor Kyle Hebert.

She did voice-over work in commercials for companies such as Blockbuster, Levi Strauss & Co. and Clinique. During the latter part of her Radio Disney tenure, Edwards voiced in a number of English-language versions of Japanese anime series for Funimation. Her most notable voice role as the child version of Goten and Videl in Dragon Ball Z. In March 2002, Edwards was hired as a producer and occasional "sidekick" for the Sander Walker in the Morning radio show on WSSS 104.7 FM in Charlotte, North Carolina.

She stayed in this position until October 31, 2003. After that morning's airing finished, the entire Sander Walker show cast and crew were informed that WSSS was switching its format to Christmas music around the clock and subsequently were all terminated. Edwards was not off the airwaves for long, however. In February 2004, she became the co-host of the Jeff Roper Morning Show syndicated from WSOC 103.7 FM, also out of Charlotte.

In January 2005, Jeff Roper left WSOC to take a morning job at WWNU 92 FM in Columbia, South Carolina.  WSOC management assigned Edwards to take up co-hosting duties with Rob Tanner as part of the new Tanner in the Morning show. The show's mix of regional humor and parodies made it one of the higher-rated morning shows in the Charlotte area's country music radio market and Edwards continued her co-hosting duties for nearly two years.

Although Edwards enjoyed her radio work, she began to feel strongly about voice acting.  In August 2006, Edwards and fellow voice actors Sean Schemmel, Christopher Sabat, and Jason Liebrecht attended the Wizard World Comics Convention in Chicago, Illinois. When Dragon Ball fans waited in line up to five hours to get her autograph, Edwards began seriously considering making voice acting her full-time job.

A few weeks later, Edwards brought her feelings to WSOC management during a monthly performance strategy meeting and told them of her desire to go into voice acting full-time and leave her position as co-host. WSOC and the Tanner show staff accepted Edwards's decision and her departure was handled amicably.

Since then, Edwards has resided in Dallas doing commercial and documentary voice-over, but occasionally returns to Funimation to reprise her Dragon Ball roles and other anime.

Personal life 
Edwards met Charlotte CBS affiliate WBTV meteorologist Chris Suchan; they married in April 2006.  They were later divorced. She gave birth to a child in August 2015.

In 2019, Edwards alleged that voice actor Vic Mignogna had sexually harassed her, citing that he had propositioned her in 2008 and 2010 without her consent. She initially revealed the allegations anonymously through io9 but later testified against him during his lawsuit.

In November 2020, Edwards married voice actor Zach Bolton.

Filmography

Anime dubbing 
 .hack//Quantum – Asta
 A Certain Magical Index series – Vento
 A Certain Scientific Railgun – Tsuzuri Tesso
 A Certain Scientific Railgun S – Tsuzuri Tesso, Febrie
 Aquarion Evol – Aika
 Aquarion Logos – Okazaki
 Azur Lane – Yorktown
 Ben-To – Kyo Sawagi 
 Boogiepop and Others – Additional Voices
 Cat Planet Cuties – Arisa Oshiro (credited as Janét Mason)
 Chaos;Head – Kozue Orihara
 Chrome Shelled Regios – Countia Varmon Farness
 Dance in the Vampire Bund – Nanami Shinonome (credited as Janét Mason)
 Danganronpa: The Animation – Chihiro Fujisaki, Alter Ego
 Darker than Black: Gemini of the Meteor – Mina Hazuki
 Dragon Ball Z – Goten, Gotenks (Goten-half), Videl (as well as Kai: The Final Chapters series), various
 Dragon Ball Super – Goten, Gotenks, Videl
 Fairy Tail – Ultear Milkovich (Child, Ep. 116)
 Fruits Basket (2019) – Kana Soma
 Guilty Crown – Kyo (Eps. 4–6), Miyabi Herikawa (Eps. 16, 18)
 Haganai – Akari Fujibayashi (Ep. 2)
 Heaven's Lost Property series – Nymph
 Hetalia: The Beautiful World – Female Russia
 High School DxD – Aika Kiryuu
 Is This a Zombie? – Eucliwood Hellscythe (Fantasy Voice, Ep. 13 OVA)
 Is This a Zombie? of the Dead – Eucliwood Hellscythe (Fantasy Voice, Eps. 9–10)
 Kaguya-sama – Moeha Fujiwara
 Kamisama Kiss 2 – Mizutama
 Last Exile -Fam, The Silver Wing – Teddy
 Linebarrels of Iron – Yuriko Moritsugu (Ep. 21)
 My Hero Academia – Kaoruko Awata
 Nobunagun – Watanabe
 Ōkami-san and her Seven Companions – Himeno Shirayuki (Eps. 9–10)
 One Piece – Lily Enstomach
 Plunderer – Greengrocer Lady (Eps. 4, 22, 24)
 The Rolling Girls – Banko (Eps. 3, 5)
 The Sacred Blacksmith – Patty Baldwin
 Sekirei series – Chiho Hidaka (credited as Janét Mason)
 Shakugan no Shana – Brigid (season 3)
 Shiki – Shihori Maeda (Ep. 21.5)
 SoltyRei – Celica Yayoi
 Soul Eater – Fairy (Ep. 9)
 Soul Eater Not! – Eternal Feather
 SSSS.Dynazenon – Mujina
 Strike Witches 2 – Junko Takei (Eps. 1, 3, 12)
 Toilet-Bound Hanako-kun – Sakura Nanamine
 Yu Yu Hakusho – Murugu
 YU-NO: A Girl Who Chants Love at the Bound of the World – Kaori Asakura

Film 
 Dragon Ball Z: Broly – Second Coming – Goten, Videl
 Dragon Ball Z: Bio-Broly – Goten
 Dragon Ball Z: Fusion Reborn – Goten, Videl
 Dragon Ball Z: Wrath of the Dragon – Goten, Videl
 Dragon Ball Z: Battle of Gods – Goten, Videl
 Dragon Ball Z: Resurrection 'F' – Videl
 Dragon Ball Super: Broly – Goten
 Dragon Ball Super: Super Hero - Videl
 Mass Effect: Paragon Lost – Christine

Live-action 
 Barney & Friends – Riff (Singing)
 Victorious – Woman

Video games 
 Battleborn – Shayne
 Borderlands 3 – Adi
 Dragon Ball series – Goten (Child), Videl, various
 The Gunstringer – Additional Voices
 Orcs Must Die! 3 – Kelsey
 SMITE – Athena, Aphrodite (Beach Babe)
 Squinkies – Princess
 Squinkies 2: Adventure Mall – Narrator

References

External links 
 
 

1977 births
Living people
People from Lubbock, Texas
Actresses from Charlotte, North Carolina
Actresses from Dallas
Actresses from Texas
American video game actresses
American voice actresses
American radio personalities
American radio producers
Radio personalities from Dallas
Radio personalities from North Carolina
American voice directors
Radio Disney DJs
21st-century American actresses
20th-century American actresses
American women radio presenters
Women radio producers